Petit Prince (Little Prince) may refer to:

 Le Petit Prince, the original French title of the famous 1943 novella by writer and aviator Antoine de Saint-Exupéry, and which was released as The Little Prince in English
 Petit-Prince (moon), the moon of asteroid 45 Eugenia
 Petit Prince, a 2021 album by French rapper Larry

See also

 
 Petit (disambiguation)
 Prince (disambiguation)
 Little Prince (disambiguation)